This is the list of songs by Robert Watson "Bob" Schmertz (March 4, 1898 – June 7, 1975). These printed and published songs are part of the Robert Schmertz Collection which is housed in the Archives Service Center, University Library System, University of Pittsburgh. These printed versions are available for academic, historical research and genealogy studies. The University provides access without charge. Schmertz was born in Pittsburgh and attended college there. He wrote the Carnegie Tartans' fight song "Fight for the Glory of Carnegie," and played the banjo.  He graduated in 1921 and then taught at the college until his retirement. Many of his songs were based upon historical events that occurred in Western Pennsylvania, Allegheny County, and the city of Pittsburgh.

Before his death on June 7, 1975, he completed a book of his songs, but it wasn't published until after his death. This is the list of songs and manuscripts written by Robert Schmertz. Most of the originals held in the University of Pittsburgh archives are written in his own hand.

References

External links
 Pittsburgh Music History

Lists of songs recorded by American artists